The Federation of Turkish Cypriot Trade Unions (TURK-SEN) is a federation of 9 trade unions  in Cyprus.
It is affiliated with the International Trade Union Confederation, and the European Trade Union Confederation.

References

External links
Türk-Sen  official website.

European Trade Union Confederation
International Trade Union Confederation
Union Federation
Turkish Unions Federation
National federations of trade unions
Trade unions established in 1954